Tönisvorst is a town in the district of Viersen, in North Rhine-Westphalia, Germany. It is situated approximately 5 km west of Krefeld.

Historical monuments
Das alte Rathaus, St. Tönis
Der Mertenshof, St. Tönis
Schluff (steam locomotive), St. Tönis
Haus Raedt, Vorst
Haus Brempt, Vorst
Haus Neersdonk, Vorst
Haus Donk, Vorst
Der Gelleshof

Twin towns – sister cities

Tönisvorst is twinned with:
 Laakdal, Belgium
 Sées, France
 Staré Město, Czech Republic

Notable people
Hans Junkermann (born 1934), racing cyclist
Klaus Abbelen (born 1960), racing driver and former executive director of Abbelen GmbH
Tobias Levels (born 1986), footballer
Lea Schüller (born 1997), footballer

References

Viersen (district)